Dysspastus ios is a moth of the family Autostichidae. It is found on the Cyclades, an island group in the Aegean Sea.

References

Moths described in 2000
Dysspastus
Moths of Europe